This is a list of notable ventriloquists and their best known characters. It is ordered by nationality or country in which they were notable in an alphabetical order, and then by alphabetical order of surname. It does not include voice-over artists who did not perform with a figure, or "dummy" as it is usually called.

Australia
Showko Showfukutei – "Ninja Ken", "Sushi Master", "Herro Kitty"

France
Jeff Panacloc – "Jean-Marc"

India
Y. K. Padhye (192? - 1967)
Indushree Raveendra- "Dinku" ,"Grandpa" ,"Nerd"
Mimicry Srinivos – "Old Man", "Little Boy", "Caesar Chimp"″micey″

Italy
Pietro Ghislandi – "Sergio"

Spain
Señor Wences (1896 - 1999) – "Johnny", "Pedro", "Cecilia Chicken"

Sweden
Zillah & Totte

United Kingdom
Ray Alan (1930 - 2010) – "Mickey the Martian", "Lord Charles", "Tich and Quackers"
Peter Brough (1916 - 1999) – "Archie Andrews"
Nina Conti – "Monkey", "Granny", "Nina", "Killer", "Great Uncle John"
Roger De Courcey – "Nookie Bear"
Terry Hall (1926 - 2007) – "Lenny the Lion"
Keith Harris (1947 - 2015) – "Orville the Duck", "Cuddles the Monkey"
Steve Hewlett – "Arthur Lager", "Pongo", "Chii Chii"
Sandy Powell (1900 - 1982)
Terri Rogers (1937 - 1999) – "Shorty Harris"
Fred Russell (1862 - 1957) – "Coster Joe"
Saveen (1914 - 1994) – "Daisy May"
Ian Saville
Dennis Spicer (1935 - 1964) – "James Green"
Arthur Worsley (1920 - 2001) – "Charlie Brown"
Paul Zerdin – "Sam", "Baby", "Albert", "Alasdair Rimmer"

United States
Jim Barber – "Barber & Seville", "Diva", "Chico Pete", "Baby", "Ventriloquist Karaoke", "Strum the Guitar", "JR"
Matt Bennett – "Rex Powers" (Victorious)
Edgar Bergen (1903 - 1978) – "Charlie McCarthy", "Mortimer Snerd", "Effie Klinker"
Shirley Dinsdale (1926 - 1999) – "Judy Splinters"
Jeff Dunham – "Peanut", "Walter", "Jose Jalapeño", "Bubba J", "Achmed the Dead Terrorist"
Alyse Eady – "Rosie", "Molly", "Crazy Bird", "Rocky"
Terry Fator – "Emma Taylor", "Winston the Impersonating Turtle", "Walter T. Airdale"
Wayne Federman – "Beuford"
Jay Johnson – "Squeaky", "Bob", "Grits", "Darwin"
Kevin Johnson – "Clyde", "Matilda"
Mallory Lewis – "Lamb Chop"
Shari Lewis (1933 - 1998) – "Lamb Chop", "Charlie Horse", "Hush Puppy"
Ronn Lucas – "Buffalo Billy", "Chuck Roast", "Scorch", "Tillie the Troll"
Darci Lynne – "Petunia", "Oscar", "Edna Doorknocker", "Katie", "Ivan"
Taylor Mason – "Paco the Pig", "Romeo", "Juliet", "Sumo", "Robert the Sheep", "Barack Obama", "Colonel", "Paquito"
Jimmy Nelson (1928 - 2019) – "Danny O'Day", "Farfel the Dog"
Otto Petersen (1960 - 2014) – "George"
Carla Rhodes – "Cecil Sinclaire"
David Strassman – "Chuck Wood", "Ted E. Bare"
Max Terhune (1891 - 1973) – "Elmer"
Willie Tyler – "Lester"
Jules Vernon (1867 - 1937) – "Old Maid", "George", "Nettie", "Sailor Joe", "Happy"
Mark Wade – "Grits", "Karl the Alligator"
Kenny Warren – "Joey O'Leary", "Leroy Cool"
Lisa Whelchel – "Arthur" (The Mickey Mouse Club)
Paul Winchell (1922 - 2005) – "Jerry Mahoney", "Knucklehead Smiff"

 
Ventriloquists